The 1920–21 season was Chelsea Football Club's twelfth competitive season.

Table

References

External links
 1920–21 season at stamford-bridge.com

1920–21
English football clubs 1920–21 season